The Old Jefferson Parish Courthouse is a historic three-story building in Gretna, Louisiana. It was designed in the Renaissance Revival style by architect R.S. Soule, and built in 1907. It was the parish courthouse until 1956. It is now the Gretna city hall. It has been listed on the National Register of Historic Places since January 21, 1983.

References

National Register of Historic Places in Jefferson Parish, Louisiana
Government buildings completed in 1907
1907 establishments in Louisiana